Zhiten may refer to the following places in Bulgaria:

Zhiten, Dobrich Province
Zhiten, Sofia